MonkeyPaw Games was an American video game publisher based in San Jose, California. They localized retro Japanese games that were never released in the West and published them on contemporary gaming consoles.

History 
The company was created by John Greiner, who was its president.

In 2012, the company attempted to run a Kickstarter alongside Gaijinworks to localize Class of Heroes 2 and publish the game's special edition. However, this failed to raise enough funds to meet the $500,000 goal. Greiner attributed this to the desire to quickly begin the Kickstarter in order to capitalize off of the success of the Double Fine Adventure Kickstarter, and not having adequate planning. Additionally, MonkeyPaw had promised to release a digital version regardless of whether it succeeded or failed, which led to a lack of urgency. Greiner stated he would continue his goal of publishing as many JRPGs as possible in the United States.

In January 2014, the company announced that it would bring 6 classic PlayStation games to PlayStation Network, in an event called "Retro Rush".

In 2015, the company announced an english localization of Class of Heroes 3., but this was ultimately never released.

References 

Video game publishers
Companies based in San Jose, California
Video game companies of the United States